Pityopsis graminifolia is a species of flowering plant in the family Asteraceae known by the common names grass-leaved golden-aster and narrowleaf silkgrass. It is native to the southeastern United States, occurring as far north as Ohio and Maryland.

Description
Despite its common name, the plant is not a grass. It is a rhizomatous perennial herb growing up to 80 centimeters tall with green or brown stems covered in silvery hairs. The leaves are grasslike, linear to lance-shaped with silvery hairs. The inflorescence contains a few to over a hundred flower heads which contain yellow ray and disc florets. This species can be quite variable and some authors divide it into several varieties.

This plant is used as an ornamental and for vegetating roadsides and other disturbed habitat. It can be used in xeriscaping. It can help control erosion. It can reproduce by seed and it can form large colonies by spreading via its rhizomes.

It is found in dry or sandy soil and pine barrens. It grows from July to September.

References

External links
USDA Plants Profile for Pityopsis graminifolia

Astereae
Plants described in 1803
Flora of the Eastern United States
Garden plants of North America
Drought-tolerant plants